Richard Sebamala ( Born in 1979), is a Ugandan civil engineer, businessman and politician who serves as a Member of Parliament representing Bukoto Central constituency in the 11th Ugandan Parliament (2021 to 2026). He was elected on 14th January 2021 during the 2021 Uganda general elections.

He is a member of the Democratic Party of Uganda. In the Parliament of  Uganda he serves as a member on the Committee of Infrastructure which supervises both the Ministry of Land & Housing  and also Ministry of Works and Transport as well as he is a member of the Public Account Committee for COSASE.

Early life and education 
Sebamala was born in Bisanje in Buddu County, Masaka District in the central region of Uganda in 1979. He finished his primary section at Nazareth Boarding Primary School, Bukalasa Seminary for Ordinary level  and sat for his UACE at Jinja in 2000.  In 2001, he joined Kyambogo University and he graduated in 2005 with a Bachelor’s Degree of Engineering in Civil and Building.  He also holds a Master's in Leadership and management from the Uganda Management Institute (2015-209).

Career 
Before his graduation from Kyambogo University in 2004, Sebamala  served as an internee at Zzimwe Construction Company, a Ugandan road construction firm. He has served in various position of engineering in different companies such as a Director at Ddaki Technical Services (2006), as a Contract Manager at Multiplex Uganda Limited (September 2009-February 2010), as a Director at Multix Limited (an engineering company) 2010-2013 before joining Iganga district Local Government as a principal executive engineer (2013-2019). Currently, Sebamala is engaged in an import and export business in Kampala city.

Political 
On 14th January 2021, he was elected as a Member of Parliament representing Bukoto County Central constituency  in the eleventh Parliament of Uganda (2021 to 2026) in the 2021 Ugandan general election and on 20th May 2021 he sworn in as the Member of Parliament.
Sebamala garnered 9916 votes hence defeating the former Vice President Edward Kiwanuka Ssekandi who had served as the Member of Ugandan Parliament for Bukoto County Central constituency since 1996.

Personal life
Sebamala is married. He is a member of the Democratic Party of Uganda.

See also 

 Parliament of Uganda
 Members of the eleventh Parliament of Uganda
 2021 Uganda general elections

References

External references
Biography

Richard Sebamala

Kyambogo University alumni
Living people
Uganda Management Institute alumni
People from Masaka District
1979 births